Cunningham is the name of places in the U.S. state of Tennessee:

Cunningham, Montgomery County, Tennessee
Cunningham, Obion County, Tennessee